Figure skates are a type of ice skate used by figure skaters. The skates consist of a boot and a blade that is attached with screws to the sole of the boot. Inexpensive sets for recreational skaters are available, but most figure skaters purchase boots and blades separately and have the blades mounted by a professional skate technician.

History
During the 19th century, new forms of ice skates were developed to allow for even more control and safer gliding. Specific figure skates were created in response to the rise of figure skating's popularity in the 19th century, coinciding with the beginnings of formalized competitions such as the World Figure Skating Championships. The name "figure" skating arises from the compulsory portion of the competition, dropped in the 1990s, requiring skaters to trace out precise figures on the ice, including perfect figure 8 circles. Figure skates are now manufactured with extreme precision for use in competitive sports. Blades are specifically designed to include various types of toe picks that allow for skaters to reach new heights for jumps and spins, depending on the skater's level.

Boots

Figure skating boots are traditionally made by hand from many layers of leather. The design of figure skating boots changed significantly during the 20th century. Old photographs of skaters such as Sonja Henie from the 1920s and 1930s show them wearing thin, supple boots reaching to mid-calf. Modern skating boots, on the other hand, are extremely rigid to support the foot and ankle in jumps, and are cut much lower—just over ankle height—to allow the foot to flex. Because the stiffness of the boots makes good fit essential, many skaters either order custom boots or have their boots "bumped out" over pressure points by a skate technician.

In recent years, boots made of synthetic materials with heat-modifiable linings have become popular with many skaters because they combine strength with lighter weight than leather boots, and are easier to "break in." The latest development in boot technology is a boot that is hinged at the ankle to provide lateral support while allowing more flexibility. Boots used in ice dance are usually slightly lower in the back to allow for greater bend in the ankle. Some boots also come with a flexible elastic back.

The typical colors for boots are black for men and white for women, although other colors are available.

Blades

Figure skates differ most visibly from hockey skates in having a set of large, jagged teeth called toe picks on the front of the blade. The toe picks are used primarily in jumping, footwork and spins and should not be used for stroking. Toe pick designs have become quite elaborate and sometimes include additional picks on the sides of the blade, often referred to as a k-pick.

The skate blades are typically made of tempered carbon steel, coated with a high-quality chrome. Lightweight aluminum and stainless steel blades are becoming more popular with skaters. There are different blades for different levels of skaters which often correspond to a skater's age, size and skill level. Blades for advanced skaters often have larger toe picks and different curves than blades for beginner, intermediate and recreational levels.

This curvature is referred to as the rocker of the blade. The sweet spot of the blade is below the ball of the foot. This spot is usually located near the stanchion of the blade, and is the part of the blade where all spins are spun on.

The blade is also hollow ground; a groove on the bottom of the blade that creates two distinct edges, inside and outside. In figure skating it is always desirable to skate on only one edge of the blade, never on both at the same time (which is referred to as a flat). The apparently effortless power and glide across the ice exhibited by elite figure skaters fundamentally derives from efficient use of the edges to generate speed.

Ice dancers' and synchronized skaters' blades are about an inch shorter in the rear than those used by skaters in other disciplines, to accommodate the intricate footwork and close partnering in dance. They also possess a smaller pick near the bottom to allow for better edge-work and less focus on jumping.

Skating, when the "physics of steel blades traveling across ice" is exploited, provides for human movement impossible in other media. For example, the minimal friction required between the narrow steel blade and the ice that melts beneath it allows a skater to glide across an ice rink. As a result of this lack of friction, the skater's body is "simultaneously motionless with respect to itself and in motion with respect to its surroundings and to a fixed visual point of view". The lack of friction also allows a skater to spin continuously in place faster and for a longer time than on any other media and surface by allowing for both linear and sustained rotational motion, which presents "a constantly changing three-dimenstional picture to a fixed observer" of the skater, who does this by either moving their body parts around the spinning center or by holding a single position. The skater can also jump higher and further, as well as stay in the air longer, than with any other media and surface. As writer Ellyn Kestnbaum states, "The use of special dance floors and shoes or equipment and media such as bodies of water, skis, trapezes and trampolines can also enable people to achieve many of these effects, but none allows for combining them with quite the fluidity of ice skating".

Blade types
Various specialty blade types exist, including:
 Tapered figure skating blades have a design which causes them to be thicker at the front near the toe picks and thinner at the tail of the blade; therefore, the edges are not parallel.
 Side-honed figure skating blades have a concave design which causes them to be thicker at the stanchions and the edge stripe and thinner in between. They are easily recognizable because they cause reflections to be inverted.
 Parabolic figure skating blades were first introduced by HD Sports in order to employ new scientific developments in the creation of figure skating blades. The middle section of parabolic blades is thinner than that of normal blades, while both ends are typically wider than those of regular blades. This translates into less steel and a lighter blade overall. Their design is meant to improve skaters' blade stability, footwork, and edges.

Blade sharpness
Blades for figure skates require a certain sharpness level to maintain control on the ice. Blades are typically sold unsharpened, and it is the responsibility of the customer to make sure the blades get sharpened before leaving the shop. Typically, the blades can be expected to be sharpened by the owner of the skate shop, but knowing one's skill level is necessary to get a correct sharpness. A deeply sharpened "V" cut on the blade should be reserved for professional figure skaters, as stopping on blades this sharp without an adequate amount of skill and strength can easily cause injuries such as sprains if one is not experienced enough. Figure skating blades that are too sharp can also be cause for concern, as the skater may find their feet slipping out to the side, making falls and sprains much more likely. Skates are sharpened by a grindstone, and the deeper the cut, the quicker the user can stop or turn on the ice. Professional skaters have their skates sharpened to the deepest possible cut in order to pull off complicated spins, jumps, and footwork. The ability to stop on a dime is important in events such as the Grand Prix, where even a single point deducted can cost the competitor the lead. If a competitor is in the unfortunate position of finding their blades to be too dull  to support themselves adequately after a jump combination, they could touch down on the ice or fall, which can ruin an otherwise point-grabbing sequence.

Skate guards
Skate guards are a cover for the blades of skates. These guards act as a cover to protect the blades from wear and tear, or to keep the blades from rusting over. Typically, blades are composed of a stainless steel frame, but even this durable material is prone to rust if left covered in moisture, such as the water and ice produced by a long day marking up the rink. The best type of skate guard for this scenario is a terry cloth guard, called "soakers," which absorb any leftover moisture and prevents the appearance of rust on the blades. Another common type of skate guard are made of hard plastic, and they are used by competitors and skaters when walking around in skates when off the ice. These durable covers delay the dulling of the blades by providing a protective barrier between the blade and the ground. Oftentimes, skate guards can be seen being used by competitors after their performances while they wait for their scores to be announced at the Kiss and Cry area. Since scores are presented soon after the performance has ended, many skaters do not have time to remove the tight laces of their skates before their placement is announced. Skate guards are also a method of personalizing one's skates, and as such, there is a decent market within the skating community for personalized and customized skate guards. Since the purpose of the guards is to protect the blades, guards can be decorated with any number of markings or materials, even being bedazzled or gold plated if the owner desires.

References

External links

Ice skate construction
History of ice skates

Ice skates
Figure skating equipment